Edvard Asser Salo (Russian Ассер Эдуардович Сало, Asser Eduardovich Salo; 22 February 1902, in Laukaa, Grand Duchy of Finland – 11 February 1938, in Karelian ASSR, Soviet Union) was a Finnish lawyer and politician. He was a member of the Parliament of Finland from 1929 to 1930, representing the Socialist Electoral Organisation of Workers and Smallholders (STPV).

On 4 June 1930, he was kidnapped in Vaasa by activists of the anti-communist Lapua Movement, who forced him under threat for his life to make a public promise to never again engage in communist activities on the territory of Vaasa Province. Soon thereafter he went into exile, first to Sweden, then to the Soviet Union, where he worked at first as a lecturer at the International Lenin School in Moscow. He worked in administrative functions in Leningrad from 1935 to 1936 and in the Karelian ASSR from 1936 until 18 August 1937, when he was dismissed.

As one of the victims of the Great Purge, he was arrested by the NKVD, sentenced to death and shot on 11 February 1938.

See also
List of kidnappings

References

1902 births
1938 deaths
Finnish emigrants to the Soviet Union
Finnish people executed by the Soviet Union
Finnish emigrants to Sweden
Finnish exiles
People from Laukaa
People from Vaasa Province (Grand Duchy of Finland)
Socialist Electoral Organisation of Workers and Smallholders politicians
Members of the Parliament of Finland (1929–30)
University of Helsinki alumni
People granted political asylum in the Soviet Union
Great Purge victims from Finland
Kidnapped politicians